Dr. Ponmek Dalaloy is a Laotian physician and politician. He served as Minister of Public Health from 1993 to 2011.

References

Lao People's Revolutionary Party politicians
Laotian physicians
Government ministers of Laos
Living people
Year of birth missing (living people)
Place of birth missing (living people)
Members of the 7th Central Committee of the Lao People's Revolutionary Party
Members of the 8th Central Committee of the Lao People's Revolutionary Party